Acacia mabellae, commonly known as Mabels's wattle or black wattle, is a shrub or tree of the genus Acacia and the subgenus Phyllodineae that is endemic to eastern Australia.

Description
It has glabrous angled branchlets with pendulous phyllodes that have a linear-elliptic to falcate, occasionally oblanceolate shape and are usually narrowed at both ends. It blooms between August and November producing simple inflorescences that occur in groups of 6 to 16 on the raceme with the spherical flower-heads contain 17 to 20 creamy white coloured flowers.

Taxonomy
The specific epithet honours Mabel Fanny Cambage who was the daughter of R.H. Cambage, a colleague of Joseph Maiden. It is also sometimes referred to as 'mabelliae', but this spelling change is not correct.

Distribution
It is native to an area of New South Wales on the coastal slopes of the Great Dividing Range from around Camden in the north down to around Bermagui in the south growing in gullies in sandy soils as a part of open Eucalyptus woodland communities.

See also
 List of Acacia species

References

mabellae
Flora of New South Wales
Plants described in 1916
Taxa named by Joseph Maiden